Agrimonia eupatoria is a species of agrimony that is often referred to as common agrimony, church steeples or sticklewort.

The whole plant is dark green with numerous soft hairs. The soft hairs aid in the plant's seed pods sticking to any animal or person coming in contact with the plant. The flower spikes have a spicy odor like apricots. In the language of flowers, agrimony means thankfulness or gratitude.

A. eupatoria is a foodplant for the caterpillars of the snout moth Endotricha flammealis.

Description

Vegetative characteristics 

Its roots are deep  rhizomes, from which spring the stems. It is characterized by its typical serrated edged pinnate leaves.

Generative characteristics
The short-stemmed flowers appear from June to September, in long, spike-like, racemose inflorescences. The hermaphrodite flower has fivefold  radial symmetry. There are five sepals present . There are  five yellow, rounded petals. The petals and the five to 20 stamens rise above the tip of the flower cup . The two medium-sized carpels in the flower cups are sunk into, but not fused with it. The fruits are achenes approximately 0.6 cm (0.2 inch) in diameter and each have a number of hooks that enable it to cling to animal fur and clothing. Each achene may have one or two seeds.

Agrimonia eupatoria is native to Europe and Southwestern Asia, where it grows in damp meadows, pasture, along stream banks, and among shrubs -  it is also cultivated in other parts of the world for medical purposes.

In folklore
Agrimony has been stated to have medical and magical properties since the time of Pliny the Elder. It is ruled astrologically by Cancer, according to Nicholas Culpeper. Common folklore held that it could cure musket wounds by being brewed into "arquebusade water," and ward off witchcraft.

Traditional British folklore states that if a sprig of the plant was placed under a person's head, they would sleep until it was removed.

Ecology
The flowers with their abundant pollen supply attract hoverflies, flies and honey bees. They also are an important food source for butterflies like the grizzled skipper. The pollinated flowers develop fruits with burs. These attach to passing  grazing animals such as cattle, sheep and deer and are spread over a large area. Agrimony is found usually in young grasslands, less than 50 years old. It is a wild host for a few insect pest species (Stigmella fragariella and Coroebus elatus) that feed on loganberries, raspberries, and strawberries in Europe.

Chemistry
Contains volatile oils, flavonoids, apigenin, luteolin, quercetin, kaempferol, tiliroside, triterpene glycosides including euscaphic acid and tormentic acid, phenolic acids, and 3%–21% tannins.

Notes

References
 Howard, Michael. Traditional Folk remedies (Century, 1987, pp 96–97)

External links

eupatoria
Medicinal plants of Europe
European witchcraft
Plants described in 1753
Taxa named by Carl Linnaeus
Herbs
Superstitions of Great Britain